The 1962 Estonian SSR Football Championship was won by Ülemiste Kalev.

Group A

Group B

Championship play-off

Bottom play-off

Top goal scorers

References

Estonian Football Championship
Est
Football